Manhattan Fever is an album by American jazz saxophonist Frank Foster recorded in 1968 and released on the Blue Note label. The CD reissue added five previously unreleased recordings from a 1969 session as bonus tracks.

Reception
The Allmusic review by Steve Leggett awarded the album 3 stars and stated "Foster's compositional and arranging talents are at center stage, but when he steps out front as a soloist like he does on "The House That Love Built," he shows why he is a top line tenor sax player".

Track listing
All compositions by Frank Foster, except as indicated
 "Little Miss No Nose" - 7:01
 "Manhattan Fever" - 10:33
 "Loneliness" - 2:58
 "Stammpede" - 5:46
 "You Gotta Be Kiddin'" - 3:29
 "Seventh Avenue Bill" (Bill English) - 11:50
 "Slug's Bag" (Mickey Tucker) - 7:07 Bonus track on CD reissue
 "What's New from the Monster Mill" - 9:24 Bonus track on CD reissue
 "Hip Shakin'" - 7:26 Bonus track on CD reissue
 "The House That Love Built" - 3:29 Bonus track on CD reissue
 "Fly by Night" (Rahsaan Roland Kirk) - 6:41 Bonus track on CD reissue
Recorded at Rudy Van Gelder Studio, Englewood Cliffs, New Jersey on March 21, 1968 (tracks 1-6) and January 31, 1969 (tracks 7-11).

Personnel
Frank Foster - tenor saxophone, alto clarinet
Marvin Stamm - trumpet (tracks 1, 2 & 4-6)
Burt Collins - trumpet, piccolo trumpet (tracks 7-9 & 11)
Garnett Brown (tracks 1, 2 & 4-6), Jimmy Cleveland (tracks 7-9 & 11) - trombone
Kenny Rogers - baritone saxophone
Ed Pazant - alto saxophone, flute, oboe (tracks 7-9 & 11)
Richard Wyands (tracks 1-6), George Cables (tracks 7-11) - piano
Bob Cranshaw - bass, electric bass (tracks 1-6)
Buster Williams - bass (tracks 7-11)
Mickey Roker - drums

References

Blue Note Records albums
Albums arranged by Frank Foster (musician)
Frank Foster (musician) albums
1968 albums
Albums recorded at Van Gelder Studio